Knut and Alice Wallenberg Foundation (KAW) is a Swedish public and private foundation formed in 1917 by Knut Agathon Wallenberg and his wife Alice Wallenberg.  It was created to support research in the natural sciences, technology and medicine by awarding long-term grants to basic research of the highest international class.

Governance
From its start in 1917 to 1971 the board members of the Foundation were mostly from the Wallenberg family. In 1971 a Council of Principals was established which changed the membership pattern, and the academics began to serve as board members of the KAW. Then politicians from the Centre Party were also assigned to the board, including Christina Rogestam, Anders Dahlgren, and Thorbjörn Fälldin.

Funding
Since its establishment it has approved funding of just over SEK 27.2 billion to Swedish research and education.  Almost SEK 14.5 billion of this was awarded between 2008 and 2018. The funding allocated annually in recent years of almost SEK 2 billion has given the Foundation its position as one of the largest private research foundations in Europe. Knut and Alice Wallenberg Foundation is the largest of the 16 foundations formed on the basis of donations from members of the Wallenberg family, or created with funds raised in honor of Wallenberg family members. The foundations are referred to collectively as the Wallenberg Foundations, and award grants totaling approximately SEK 2.2 billion each year.

See also 
Foundation Asset Management AB (FAM)
Skandinaviska Enskilda Banken (SEB)
Wallenberg family
Wallenberg AI, Autonomous Systems and Software Program

References
Knut and Alice Wallenberg Foundation – 100 years in support of excellent Swedish research and education (book)

External links

Foundations based in Sweden
Companies related to the Wallenberg family